Michael "Iz the Wiz" Martin (November 8, 1958 – June 17, 2009, aged 50) was one of the most prominent graffiti writers of the New York graffiti movement of the late 1970s and early 1980s.

Biography
Martin was from the New York City borough of Queens, a Rockaway Beach native. Beginning in 1972, he became a long reigning All-City king of New York, known primarily for his quick, simple two letter tag, 'IZ'. IZ represented a new breed of fame-obsessed writers concerned with finding the perfect balance between quantity and quality. He also wrote "CI" (for Crazy IZ), and "Ike", (short for Mike). He rolled with few crews, the most notable being TMB (The Master Blasters), RTW (Rolling Thunder Writers), and TPA (The Public Animals). He wrote graffiti on every train line in New York City. IZ was also prominently featured in the 1983 documentary Style Wars.
IZ THE WIZ started writing with Evil 13
FI 1 and after going through a variety of names BENZ CLICK2 SCAT he wrote his name Mike then dropped The M and chose IKE327. He started to write IZ first with VINNY and in 1976 when the movie the Wiz cane out, the advertising posters on the subway stations stateD the Wiz is a Wow. So IZ thought if the wiz is a wow why can’t IZ be THE WIZ.
So was born the name IZ THE WIZ.

On September 29, 1990, Martin married Katherine M. Lucev, also from the Rockaways, in St. Rose of Lima Church in Rockaway Beach, New York.
 
IZ was diagnosed with kidney failure in 1996 after years of using toxic aerosol products without any type of protective mask. In early 2000, in an interview for Style Wars revisited, he commented that he would give up all his past fame for full health. In August 2003 he self-curated a solo gallery exhibition in New York City showcasing his legal artwork.

IZ also had his art appear in video games such as Marc Eckō's Getting Up: Contents Under Pressure and The Warriors. His tag is also seen in the 1979 cult movie The Warriors. His work is also mentioned in Lauren Wilkinson (writer)'s book "American Spy" in a scene where the protagonist is walking down a NYC street covered by IZ tags.

Martin died of a heart attack on June 17, 2009 in Spring Hill, Florida.

References

External links
Official Website
Early Graffiti by Iz
Interview with Iz

1958 births
2009 deaths
People from Queens, New York
American graffiti artists
20th-century American painters
American male painters
20th-century American male artists